Joseph L. Armstrong was a professor at Duke University (at the time, called "Trinity College") best known for reforming Duke's curriculum in the late nineteenth century, changing it to a German research university model with the help of John Franklin Crowell. Armstrong did his undergraduate work at Johns Hopkins University and graduate work at the University of Leipzig.

References 

Duke University faculty
Johns Hopkins University alumni
Leipzig University alumni